A special election was held in  April 24–26, 1810 to fill a vacancy left by the resignation of William Denning (DR), who had never actually served.

Election returns

Mitchill took his seat on December 4, 1810

See also
List of special elections to the United States House of Representatives

References

New York 1810 02
New York 1810 02
1810 02
New York 02
United States House of Representatives 02
United States House of Representatives 1810 02